The Omo River is a tributary of the Maicasagi River located at Eeyou Istchee Baie-James (municipality), in the administrative region of Nord-du-Québec, in the Canadian province of Quebec, in Canada.

The upper part of the course of the Omo River flows in the southwestern part of the Assinica Wildlife Sanctuary, then the river flow in township De Lucière, De Berey and De Dobeil.

The hydrographic slope of the Omo River is served by road 113 linking Lebel-sur-Quévillon to Chibougamau.

The surface of the Omo River is usually frozen from early November to mid-May, however safe ice movement is generally from mid-November to mid-April.

Geography 
The main hydrographic slopes near the Omo River are:
North side: Assinica Lake, Assinica River, Brock River;
East side: Comencho Lake, Opataca Lake;
South side: Mildred River, Caupichigau River, Chibougamau River;
West side: Maicasagi River, Monsan River.

The Omo River originates at the mouth of an unidentified lake (length:  altitude) in the Assinica Wildlife Sanctuary. This source of the river is located at:
 North of the mouth of the Omo River (confluence with the Maicasagi River);
 Northeast of the mouth of the Maicasagi River (confluence with Maicasagi Lake);
 Northeast of the mouth of Goéland Lake (Waswanipi River);
 Northeast of the mouth of Matagami Lake;
 South of the mouth of the Nottaway River;
 Northeast of downtown Matagami.

Toponymy 
The toponym "Monsan River" was formalized on December 5, 1968, at the Commission de toponymie du Québec, i.e. at the creation of this commission

Upper part of the Omo River (segment of )

 westerly crossing an unidentified lake, then to the South crossing a second unidentified lake, to a creek (coming from the Northeast);
 southwesterly, crossing an unidentified lake, up to at its mouth;
 to the Southwest, then crossing an unidentified lake to at its mouth;
 southwesterly to a bay on the eastern shore of Lake Omo;
 southwesterly, crossing Omo Lake over its full length;

Lower part of the Omo River (segment of )

 to the Southeast, crossing an unidentified lake, up to at its confluence;
 westerly across an unidentified lake, to its confluence;
 southwesterly across an unidentified lake, its confluence;
 southeasterly to mouth.

The "Omo River" flows into a river bend on the east bank of the Maicasagi River. From there, it flows southwest and west to the east shore of Maicasagi Lake. Then the current flows south-west through the Max Passage into the Goéland Lake. The latter is crossed to the northwest by the Waswanipi River which is a tributary of Matagami Lake.

The mouth of the Omo River located at:
 Northeast of the mouth of the Maicasagi River (confluence with Maicasagi Lake);
 Northeast of the mouth of Gull Lake (Waswanipi River);
 Northeast of the mouth of Olga Lake (Waswanipi River);
North of the village center of Waswanipi;
 Northeast of downtown Matagami.

Toponymy 
Of Cree origin, this hydronym means the river where I ate only part of the dinner.

The toponym "Omo River" was formalized on December 5, 1968, at the Commission de toponymie du Québec, i.e. at the creation of this commission

References

See also 

Rivers of Nord-du-Québec
Nottaway River drainage basin
Eeyou Istchee James Bay